Harry Zachariah (4 June 1911 – 15 March 2009) was an Australian cricketer. He played two first-class cricket matches for Victoria between 1935 and 1936.

See also
 List of Victoria first-class cricketers

References

External links
 

1911 births
2009 deaths
Australian cricketers
Victoria cricketers